Helleland may refer to:

People
Linda Cathrine Hofstad Helleland (born 1977), a Norwegian politician for the Conservative Party
Trond Helleland (born 1962), a Norwegian politician representing the Conservative Party

Places
Helleland, a village in Eigersund municipality in Rogaland county, Norway
Helleland (municipality), a former municipality in Rogaland county, Norway
Helleland Church, a church in Eigersund municipality in Rogaland county, Norway
Helleland Station, a railway station in the village of Helleland in Eigersund municipality in Rogaland county, Norway